The Brockville Braves are a Junior "A" ice hockey team from Brockville, Ontario, Canada.  They are a part of the Central Canada Hockey League. Such NHLers as Larry Robinson and current player Wayne Simmonds of the Toronto Maple Leafs, amongst other famous players, have all played for the Braves.

History
The Brockville Braves (est. 1963) are the oldest continuously operated franchise in the CCHL.  In 1979, the team received national attention after being left homeless from an arena collapse.  They played their home games at Cardinal and Rockland.

It took until 1986 for the Brockville Braves to win a CJHL championships.  They clinched the Bogart Cup on a late April night, defeating their nemesis Pembroke 8-7 in the finals.  Braves' goalie Jacques Breault was the hero, as with 22 seconds to go in the game, turned away a penalty shot by the league's all-time leading scorer Luc Chabot.  Although losing to Orillia in the Ontario playdowns, the team was a memorable one.  Notable members of this team were all-time Braves leading scorer Larry Mitchell, Breault, Paul Duford, Tim Dubas, Dan Nummikoski, Steve Rachwal, Chad Badawey and Rob White.

Since that championship, the team has experienced more bad times than good.  The late 1980s and early 1990s were not good to the Braves, who failed to make the playoffs multiple times.

In 1997, times began to change for the better again.  The Braves competed in and won in Quebec, the Fred Page Cup, the Eastern Canadian Junior "A" championship.  This allowed for their team to compete in the event and give them the experience they needed for the next season.  The Braves regained their league title in 1998, bringing the club around full circle.

Former NHLer Todd Gill purchased the Brockville Braves and has been the head coach since 2006-07. He helped bring the Fred Page Cup to Brockville for the first time for 2010. Gill played in the NHL from 1984 to 2003 playing for the Toronto Maple Leafs, San Jose Sharks, Detroit Red Wings, Phoenix Coyotes, and St. Louis Blues. Former Braves head coach Mike McCourt was recently named head coach of the OHL's Niagara Ice Dogs for 2009-10. McCourt was head coach with Brockville from 2003 to 2006.

In 2009-2010, the Braves established a league record for most consecutive wins with 26. Brockville completed easy series wins over Kemptville (4-0) and Ottawa (4-0) to win a birth in the finals against the Pembroke Lumber Kings - as predicted by many CJHL followers. However, it was Pembroke that made CJHL history by winning four-consecutive Art Bogart Cup championships knocking off the Braves in 5 games. Despite, the finals loss to the Lumber Kings, the Braves won the Fred Page Cup against the Lumber Kings in an all-league finals tilt as the Braves won 5-1. At the Royal Bank Cup in Dauphin, Manitoba, the Braves broke a Royal Bank Cup record the highest margin of victory by defeating the Oakville Blades 11-2. (The previous record was held by the 1999 Vernon Vipers, who defeated the Charlottetown Abbies 9-3 in the championship game in Yorkton, SASK). The Braves would still have to win their last game against the La Ronge Ice Wolves, in which they did 6-3 to earn a birth in the semi-finals against the defending RBC champions, Vernon Vipers. Vernon went on to win the game 2-0, leaving the Braves out.

In 2014, the Brockville Braves were sold to former CCHL goaltender Dustin Traylen, who became the general manager. The previous owner was Todd Gill, who sold the Braves because he got a coaching job with the Kingston Frontenacs of the Ontario Hockey League in 2011.

Season-by-season record

Note: GP = Games Played, W = Wins, L = Losses, T = Ties, OTL = Overtime Losses, GF = Goals for, GA = Goals against

Fred Page Cup 
Eastern Canada Championships
MHL - QAAAJHL - CCHL - Host
Round robin play with 2nd vs 3rd in semi-final to advance against 1st in the finals.

 * Tournament Host

Royal Bank Cup
CANADIAN NATIONAL CHAMPIONSHIPS
Dudley Hewitt Champions - Central, Fred Page Champions - Eastern, Western Canada Cup Champions - Western, Western Canada Cup - Runners Up and Host
Round robin play with top 4 in semi-final and winners to finals.

Championships

CJHL Bogart Cup Championships: 1986, 1998
Eastern Canadian Fred Page Cup Championships: 1998, 2010
CJAHL Royal Bank Cup Championships: None

Notable alumni 
Terry Carkner
Brian Chapman
Chris Clifford
Mark Cornforth
Todd Gill
Brett Harkins
Murray Kuntz
Hank Lammens
Kevin MacDonald
Paul MacLean
Larry Robinson
Ray Sheppard
Wayne Simmonds
Gord Smith
Trevor Stienburg

External links
Brockville Braves Website

Central Canada Hockey League teams
Sport in Brockville
Ice hockey clubs established in 1963
1963 establishments in Ontario